The Waimea River is the largest and the longest river on the island of Kauai in the U.S. state of Hawaii. At  in length, it is the 3rd  longest rivers in the Hawaiian Islands, draining one sixth of the total area of the island.

It rises in a wet plateau of the island's central highlands, in the Alaka'i Swamp, the largest high-elevation swamp in the world.  It flows south, passing through the spectacular  Waimea Canyon, known as the "Grand Canyon of the Pacific."

The valleys of the Waimea River and its tributary, the Makaweli River, were once heavily populated.  It enters the Pacific Ocean at Waimea, near the 1778 landing place of Captain Cook on Kauai.

References

External links
 River Restoration Programs 
 Geology of the Waimea Canyon Area

Rivers of Kauai
Surfing locations in Hawaii